The 2004 World Figure Skating Championships were held at the Westfalenhalle in Dortmund, Germany from March 22 to 28. Medals were awarded in the disciplines of men's singles, ladies' singles, pair skating, and ice dancing.

Medal table

Competition notes
Due to the large number of participants, the men's and ladies' qualifying groups and the ice dancing compulsory dance were split into groups A and B. Ice dancers performed the same compulsory dance in both groups. The compulsory dance was the Midnight Blues.

Results

Men

Ladies

Pairs

Ice dancing

External links

 
 Women's skating
 Kwan's short program
 ESPN
 Plushenko Wins Again

World Figure Skating Championships
World Figure Skating Championships
World 2004
World Figure Skating Championships, 2004
2000s in North Rhine-Westphalia
March 2004 sports events in Europe
21st century in Dortmund